Sébastien Grosjean was the defending champion but lost in the quarterfinals to Àlex Corretja.

Gustavo Kuerten won in the final 6–4, 6–3 against Sargis Sargsian.

Seeds

  Rainer Schüttler (semifinals)
  Sébastien Grosjean (quarterfinals)
  Gustavo Kuerten (champion)
  Max Mirnyi (first round)
  Mikhail Youzhny (second round)
  Vince Spadea (quarterfinals)
  Gastón Gaudio (second round)
  Marat Safin (first round)

Draw

Finals

Top half

Bottom half

References
 2003 St. Petersburg Open Draw

St. Petersburg Open
2003 ATP Tour
2003 in Russian tennis